"He Ain't Worth Missing" is a song written and recorded by American country music singer Toby Keith.  It was released in June 1993 as the second single from his self-titled debut album. The song peaked at number 5 on the U.S. Billboard Hot Country Songs chart and at number 11 on the Canadian RPM country tracks. It also peaked at number 7 on the Billboard Bubbling Under Hot 100, making it a minor crossover hit.

Content
The song is a mid-tempo in which the narrator sympathizes with a woman whose boyfriend has left her. He tells her that "he ain't worth missing" and tries to start a romance with her.

Music video
The music video for the song begins with a man playing the piano at a bar. Scenes also feature Keith singing the song in his bedroom, and himself at a bar with a woman, who is feeling bad for her, as the man gets up and leaves the bar.

Critical reception
Deborah Evans Price, of Billboard magazine reviewed the song unfavorably saying "lyrical and musical cliches are surrounded by tired, soft-rock synth patches on Keith's flimsy sophomore effort." She also said that Keith is looking for hooks "in all the wrong places" and that the "overdubbed pedal steel guitar is the only trace of country in this midtempo lament."

Chart performance
"He Ain't Worth Missing" debuted at number 71 Hot Country Singles & Tracks chart dated July 3, 1993. It charted for 20 weeks on that chart, and peaked at number 5 on the country chart dated October 23, 1993.

Year-end charts

References

1993 singles
1993 songs
Toby Keith songs
Songs written by Toby Keith
Song recordings produced by Harold Shedd
Mercury Records singles